Haji Ghalib is a citizen of Afghanistan who was held in extrajudicial detention in the United States Guantanamo Bay detention camps, in Cuba. His Guantanamo Internment Serial Number was 987. Guantanamo counter-terrorism analysts estimate he was born in 1963, in Nangarhar, Afghanistan. Ghalib was repatriated on February 28, 2007.

Ghalib was sent to Guantanamo following anonymous denunciations.  He argued that he had been a loyal government official.  When he was finally repatriated the Afghan government reappointed him to senior security positions, where he became one of Afghanistan's most effective opponents to the central government's opponents.

Combatant Status Review Tribunal

Initially the Bush administration asserted that they could withhold all the protections of the Geneva Conventions to captives from the war on terror.  This policy was challenged before the Judicial branch. Critics argued that the USA could not evade its obligation to conduct competent tribunals to determine whether captives are, or are not, entitled to the protections of prisoner of war status.

Subsequently, the Department of Defense instituted the Combatant Status Review Tribunals.  The Tribunals, however, were not authorized to determine whether the captives were lawful combatants—rather they were merely empowered to make a recommendation as to whether the captive had previously been correctly determined to match the Bush administration's definition of an enemy combatant.

Summary of Evidence memo

A Summary of Evidence memo was prepared for 
Ghalib's
Combatant Status Review Tribunal, 
on 
1 October 2004.
The memo listed the following allegations against him:

Transcript
Ghalib chose to participate in his Combatant Status Review Tribunal.
The Department of Defense released a ten-page summarized transcript of the Tribunal on March 3, 2006.

Witness and document requests
Ghalib requested the testimony of three witnesses and some exculpatory evidence.  One of his witnesses was a 
fellow Guantanamo detainee, Kako Kandahari.  Kandahari was scheduled to testify in person.  His other two witnesses were in Afghanistan,  as were the documents he requested.  The Tribunal's president told Ghalib the Department of Defense had requested the US State Department to request the Afghanistan Embassy in Washington to request the assistance of the Afghan Civil Service to locate the witnesses and the documents Ghalib needed.

The request to the US State Department went out on October 13, 2004, with a deadline of November 8, 2004.
By November 24, 2004, the date of the Tribunal, no reply had been received, so the Tribunal's president ruled
that those witnesses, and those documents, were "not reasonably available".

Testimony
Ghalib denied being a member of the Taliban. He asserted that he had been a member of the anti-Taliban resistance for eight years,   fighting under Haji Abdul Cades and his brother Haji Abdul Haq. He said he was present when Abdul Haq was killed, and was very close to Abdul Cades. He asked for the testimony of Haji Bemohab Mohammed, the new Governor of Jalalabad and Haji Mohammed Sahara. He said he named these two men because he knew they were well known to American officials. He felt sure that their testimony would have established his innocence.

Ghalib told his Tribunal that he had captured many Arabs and Taliban, and turned them over to American custody. He said he had even been part of the unit that went with the Americans to destroy Osama bin Laden's house. He told his Tribunal he had much documentary and video evidence, back in Afghanistan, that would establish his innocence.

Ghalib told his Tribunal that he found the accusation that he had a letter from a Taliban leader shocking.

Ghalib told his Tribunal that, two months before his capture he had found out that a Mr. Hadrataly, a commander in Jalalabad,  had written a letter falsely denouncing him to American authorities. Ghalib attributed the false denunciation to Hadrataly being  from a different party jockeying for power during Afghanistan's reconstruction.

Ghalib told his Tribunal that he responded to learning about the letter by traveling to Kabul and appealing to a senior official with ties to the Americans, to explain to them that he was innocent

Upon his return he learned the Americans had inspected armories maintained by Haji Jabar, who was the District Manager. The Americans emptied those armories. Ghalib said, as part of his official duties, he too managed an Armory, a sealed Armory, that had not been inspected by the Americans. A few days after his return Americans arrested him, in his office,

Administrative Review Board hearing
Detainees who were determined to have been properly classified as "enemy combatants" were scheduled to have their dossier reviewed at annual Administrative Review Board hearings. The Administrative Review Boards weren't authorized to review whether a detainee qualified for POW status, and they weren't authorized to review whether a detainee should have been classified as an "enemy combatant".

They were authorized to consider whether a detainee should continue to be detained by the United States, because they continued to pose a threat—or whether they could safely be repatriated to the custody of their home country, or whether they could be set free.

Summary of Evidence memo
A Summary of Evidence memo was prepared for Ghalib's  Administrative Review Board hearing on July 25, 2005.

The following primary factors favor continued detention

The following primary factors favor release or transfer

Transcript
Ghalib chose to participate in his Administrative Review Board hearing.
In April 2006 the Department of Defense released a 13-page summarized transcript of the hearing.

Board recommendations
In early September 2007 the Department of Defense released two heavily redacted memos, from his Board, to Gordon England, the Designated Civilian Official.
The Board's recommendation was unanimous
The Board's recommendation was redacted.
England authorized his transfer on 22 October 2005.

Repatriation
On November 25, 2009, the Department of Defense published a list of the dates captives were transferred from Guantanamo.
According to that list
Ghalib Hassan
was transferred on February 8, 2007.  Ghalib is considered a leader in the anti-Taliban resistance under Abdul Haq. Ghalib's tribe, the Shinwari, have signed an Anti-Taliban pact.

Return to the battlefield

While Ghalib's Guantanamo dossier recorded American official's fears that he would "return to the battlefield", his return was as a loyal leader on behalf of the central government.

A profile of Ghalib published on the front page of the New York Times, on November 27, 2015, noted that Joint Task Force Guantanamo authorities had feared he would return to the battlefield, if he were freed from Guantanamo.
However, Joseph Goldstein pointed out that Ghalib had set aside all the bitterness triggered by the injustice and brutality of his treatment in Guantanamo, and relied on his idea of what best served his nation, and had returned to fight on behalf of Afghanistan's central government.

The article noted that he had returned to senior positions in the fight against both the Taliban, and new elements of ISIS that were being found in Afghanistan.  The article noted that he now faced Abdul Rahim Muslimdost, another Guantanamo captive, who held a senior position in ISIS.   The two men had been friends, in GUantanamo, where their cells had been adjacent cells.  Ironically, Muslimdost was one of the 38 captives who had been cleared of suspicions of being an enemy combatant, by his 2004 Combatant Status Review Tribunal, while Ghalib was held for a further two and a half years, and was repatriated without being cleared of suspicion.

The article noted how the Taliban had assassinated many of his relatives, when he first started fighting against them.
It noted that when more senior Taliban leaders noted how effective an opponent he was they reached out to Ghalib and offered to kill the more junior Taliban leaders who were responsible for order the execution of his family members, if only he would retire from fighting them—an offer Ghalib declined.

The Tribune, a newspaper published in Pakistan, compared Ghalib with another captive he made friends with, in Guantanamo -- Abdul Rahim Muslim Dost.  Muslim Dost also joined in the hostilities that plagued Afghanistan—but on the other side.  In recent years he served as a leader of the IS forces in Afghanistan.

See also 
 Guantanamo Bay detention camp

References

External links 
Shadow of Guantanamo follows freed inmates back to their homes
Haji Ghalib Hassan - Video
Ghalib Hassan - Guantanamo Inmate Database

Living people
Bagram Theater Internment Facility detainees
Guantanamo detainees known to have been released
Year of birth uncertain
1963 births
Afghan extrajudicial prisoners of the United States
People from Nangarhar Province